Janet Helen Johnson (born December 24, 1944) is an American Egyptologist and academic, specializing in Egyptian language and the Late Period of ancient Egypt. Since 2003, she has been Morton D. Hull Distinguished Service Professor of Egyptology at the University of Chicago. She was Director of Chicago's Oriental Institute from 1983 to 1989.

Johnson studied at the University of Chicago, graduating with a Bachelor of Arts (BA) degree in 1967 and a Doctor of Philosophy (PhD) degree in 1972. She has spent almost all of her academic career at the University of Chicago: she was appointed assistant professor in 1972, promoted to associate professor in 1979 and to professor in 1981. She has also been a research associate at the Field Museum of Natural History, holding the position from 1980 to 1984 and from 1994 to 1999.

Honors
Johnson was awarded a Festschrift in 2018: it was titled "Essays for the Library of Seshat: Studies Presented to Janet H. Johnson on the Occasion of Her 70th Birthday" and was edited by Robert K. Ritner.

Selected works

References

External links
 Chicago Demotic Dictionary

 

 
 
 

1944 births
Living people
American Egyptologists
University of Chicago faculty
American archaeologists
American women archaeologists
University of Chicago alumni
People associated with the Field Museum of Natural History
American women historians
21st-century American women